Pat Cullen (born 1965) is a Northern Irish nurse and trade unionist. Since July 2021, she has been General Secretary of the Royal College of Nursing.

Early life 
Cullen was born in Carrickmore, County Tyrone and was the youngest of seven children.

Career 
Cullen worked as a community nurse in West Belfast during the Troubles. She went on to hold roles at the Public Health Agency and the Health and Social Care Board, before joining the Royal College of Nursing in 2016. In May 2019, she became director of the Northern Irish branch of the RCN. She started acting as General Secretary & Chief Executive in April 2021, and was appointed as interim General Secretary and Chief Executive of the national RCN in July 2021.

In late 2022, she led the National Health Service strikes in which English and Welsh nurses striked for the first time in the nursing union's 106-year history.

References 

1965 births
Living people
People from County Tyrone
Royal College of Nursing
21st-century women from Northern Ireland
British trade union leaders
Women trade union leaders
Trade unionists from Northern Ireland
British nurses